The Indianapolis Daredevils, known officially as the Indy Daredevils, was an American soccer club based in Indianapolis, Indiana that was a member of the American Soccer League. The team's home field was the Butler Bowl at Butler University.

The team was previously known as the New England Oceaneers.

Year-by-year

References

Defunct soccer clubs in Indiana
Daredevils
American Soccer League (1933–1983) teams
Soccer clubs in Indiana